CD23, also known as Fc epsilon RII, or FcεRII, is the "low-affinity" receptor for IgE, an antibody isotype involved in allergy and resistance to parasites, and is important in regulation of IgE levels. Unlike many of the antibody receptors, CD23 is a C-type lectin. It is found on mature B cells, activated macrophages, eosinophils, follicular dendritic cells, and platelets.

There are two forms of CD23: CD23a and CD23b.  CD23a is present on follicular B cells, whereas CD23b requires IL-4 to be expressed on T-cells, monocytes, Langerhans cells, eosinophils, and macrophages.

Function 

CD23 is known to have a role of transportation in antibody feedback regulation. Antigens which enter the blood stream can be captured by antigen specific IgE antibodies. The IgE immune complexes that are formed bind to CD23 molecules on B cells, and are transported to the B cell follicles of the spleen. The antigen is then transferred from CD23+ B cells to CD11c+ antigen presenting cells. The CD11c+ cells in turn present the antigen to CD4+ T cells, which can lead to an enhanced antibody response.

Clinical significance 

The allergen responsible in dust mite allergy Der p 1 is known to cleave CD23 from a cell’s surface. As CD23 is soluble, it can move freely and interact with cells in plasma. Recent studies have shown that increased levels of soluble CD23 cause the recruitment of non-sensitised B-cells in the presentation of antigen peptides to allergen-specific B-cells, therefore increasing the production of allergen specific IgE. IgE, in turn, is known to upregulate the cellular expression of CD23 and Fc epsilon RI (high-affinity IgE receptor).

In flow cytometry, CD23 is helpful in the differentiation of chronic lymphocytic leukemia (CD23-positive) from mantle cell lymphoma (CD23-negative). CD23 can also be demonstrated in germinal centre follicular dendritic cells using immunohistochemistry but is minimally expressed by benign germinal center B cells. In contrast to neoplastic mantle cells (which are negative for CD23), the resting cells of physiologic mantle zone express CD23. Paradoxically, Lymphomas arising from the mantle zone are generally negative for CD23, while most B-cell chronic lymphomocytic leukaemias are positive, allowing immunohistochemistry to distinguish these conditions, which otherwise have a similar appearance. Reed–Sternberg cells are usually positive for CD23.

See also 
Cluster of differentiation, a list of all the CD-numbered proteins

References

Further reading

External links
 
 PDBe-KB provides an overview of all the structure information available in the PDB for Human Low affinity immunoglobulin epsilon Fc receptor

Fc receptors
Clusters of differentiation